"Traces" is a 1968 song by the American rock band Classics IV. Released as a single in January 1969, the cut served as the title track off the album of the same name.  Written by Buddy Buie, J. R. Cobb, and Emory Gordy Jr., the song peaked at No. 2 on 29 March 1969 on the Hot 100, as well as No. 2 on the  Easy Listening music charts, making it the highest-charting single by the Classics IV. The song is noted for its use of an oboe, heard in the introduction, as well as a string section.

"Traces" received the honor of being listed in BMI's Top 100 Songs of the Century at No. 32.

Chart history

Cover versions
Jane Morgan, on her 1969 LP of the same name, as well as releasing it as a single that same year.
"Traces" is the opening track on Bert Kaempfert & His Orchestra's album Traces of Love (1969).
The Lettermen recorded it as a part of a medley, which also featured the song "Memories" (1969).
 Mel Torme (1969), on the album Rains Drops Keep Falling on my Head. 
Soul singer Billy Paul, on his 1970 album Ebony Woman.  
Harry James on his 1976 album The King James Version (Sheffield Lab LAB 3).
Gloria Estefan covered the song in 1994.
Guilherme Arantes recorded "Traces" in 1995.

References

1969 singles
Classics IV songs
Imperial Records singles
1968 songs
Songs written by Buddy Buie
Songs written by J. R. Cobb
Songs written by Emory Gordy Jr.
Torch songs